Tobias Druitt is an author of fantasy novels.  Tobias Druitt is the pseudonym of two authors who write together, Diane Purkiss and Michael Dowling.

Diane Purkiss is a tutor in English at Keble College, Oxford University, and she is the first Oxford English faculty member since C. S. Lewis and J. R. R. Tolkien to publish a children's book.

Michael Dowling is Diane Purkiss' son.  He is one of the subjects of the ongoing Channel 4 documentary series, Child Genius.

Bibliography 

 Corydon and the Island of Monsters (2005)
 Corydon and the Fall of Atlantis (2006)
 Corydon and the Siege of Troy (2007)

Footnotes 

British fantasy writers
Pseudonymous writers